St Oliver Plunkett Football Club is a Northern Irish, Intermediate football club playing in Division 1B of the Northern Amateur Football League. The club is based in west Belfast, and was formed in 1969. The club plays in the Irish Cup.

Honours

Junior honours

Cochrane Corry Cup: 1
1982-83
County Antrim Junior Shield: 1
2002–03
NAFL Division 2A: 2
2013-14
2018-19

Intermediate Honours

NAFL Division 1C: 1
2021-22

References

External links
  Club website

Association football clubs in Northern Ireland
Association football clubs established in 1969
Association football clubs in Belfast
Northern Amateur Football League clubs
1969 establishments in Northern Ireland